Pirig-me (Sumerian: , Pirig-me), was a Sumerian ruler (ensi) of the state of Lagash in Southern Mesopotamia who ruled c. 2200 BCE. He was the son of Ur-Ningirsu I.

Pirig-me is only known from one inscription and from one year name:

The inscription on a brick reads:

His was succeeded by Lu-baba.

References

22nd-century BC Sumerian kings
Kings of Lagash